Abu ol Baq (also Romanized as Abū ol Baq; also known as Abol Beq) is a village in Howmeh Rural District, in the Central District of Damghan County, Semnan Province, Iran. At the 2006 census, its population was 70, in 23 families.

References 

Populated places in Damghan County